This is a list of South Korean regions by GDP. All data are sourced from the latest regional statistics published by the South Korean Government, the OECD and the International Monetary Fund (IMF). The South Korean won has been converted to the international dollar using the IMF's Purchasing Power Parity conversion rate.

By GDP (PPP,2016)

By GDP per capita (nominal) (2019)

See also 
 Administrative divisions of South Korea
 Economy of South Korea
 List of subnational entities

References 

S
GDP
GDP
South Korea